Nekeshia Shiondrail Henderson (born February 28, 1973) is an American former professional basketball guard who played for the Houston Comets of the Women's National Basketball Association (WNBA). She played college basketball at Texas. She also played for the San Jose Lasers and Colorado Xplosion of the American Basketball League (ABL).

Early years and college career
Henderson attended South Oak Cliff High School in Dallas, Texas.

Henderson played for the Texas Longhorns of the University of Texas from 1991 to 1995, playing in 96 games and starting 64. She recorded 12.0 points, 3.9 rebounds, 4.7 assists and 1.9 steals per game during her college career. She earned First Team All-Southwest Conference honors and was named the SWC Freshman of the Year in 1992. Henderson garnered Second Team All-SWC recognition in 1995. She was named the Team MVP for the 1994–95 season. She graduated with a bachelor's degree in applied learning & development.

Professional career

San Jose Lasers and Colorado Xplosion
Henderson began her professional career playing for the San Jose Lasers and Colorado Xplosion. She signed a replacement contract with the Colorado Xplosion in December 1996.

Houston Comets
Henderson spent the 1997 season on the Houston Comets' developmental squad as a shooting guard. She was released shortly after the 1997 season ended. She tore an anterior cruciate ligament in her knee before the start of the 2000 season. Henderson signed with the Comets on May 1, 2000 and spent the entire season on the injured list. She played 23 games for the team during the 2001 season as a point guard, averaging 1.1 points, 0.9 rebounds and 1.0 assists per game. She was waived by the Comets on May 22, 2002.

BK Klosterneuburg and Elitzur Holon
Henderson played overseas after her initial release from the Houston Comets in 1997. She participated in the 1997–98 Ronchetti Cup with BK Klosterneuburg, an Austrian team. She also played in the 1998–99 Ronchetti Cup with Elitzur Holon, a team from the Israeli Female Basketball Premier League.

National team career
Henderson competed with USA Basketball as a member of the 1993 Jones Cup Team that won the Bronze in Taipei.

References

External links
Just Sports Stats
WNBA profile

1973 births
Living people
African-American basketball players
American expatriate basketball people in Austria
American expatriate basketball people in Israel
American women's basketball players
Basketball players from Dallas
Colorado Xplosion players
Houston Comets players
Point guards
Texas Longhorns women's basketball players
San Jose Lasers players
Shooting guards
Undrafted Women's National Basketball Association players
21st-century African-American sportspeople
21st-century African-American women
20th-century African-American sportspeople
20th-century African-American women